The 2012–13 President's Trophy was one of two first-class cricket competitions that were held in Pakistan during the 2012–13 season, the other being the Quaid-e-Azam Trophy. It was the inaugural edition of the President's Trophy. Ten departmental teams each played nine 4-day matches in a round-robin league phase between 3 October and 7 December 2012, with the top two teams contesting the final on 11–14 January 2013.

Sui Northern Gas Pipelines Limited went undefeated in claiming the title, winning six of their nine group matches and beating Habib Bank Limited in the final.

Background
Before the start of the 2012–13 season, the Pakistan Cricket Board restructured the domestic system by separating the regional and department sides, who had both competed in the Quaid-e-Azam Trophy over the previous seasons, with the departments moving into a new President's Trophy competition and the regions remaining in the Quaid-e-Azam Trophy.

Format
In 2012–13 season of the President's Trophy, ten departmental teams each played nine 4-day matches in a round-robin league phase, with the top two teams contesting the final.

Group stage

Points Table

Source:

The order in the table is determined by total points, followed by number of matches won, fewest matches lost, and then net run rate.

Results

Round 1

Report

Round 2

Report

Round 3

Report

Round 4

Report

Round 5

PIA v HBL, KRL v SBP and ZTBL v SNGPL Report
NBP v PQA Report
WAPDA v UBL Report

Round 6

Report

Round 7

Report

WAPDA v NBP

Round 8

ZTBL v PQA, NBP v UBL Report

WAPDA v SBP, KRL v PIA, SNGPL v HBL Report

Round 9

Report

Final

Statistics

Most runs

Last updated 30 November 2012

Highest scores

Last updated 30 November 2012

Most wickets

Last updated 30 November 2012

Best bowling

Last updated 30 November 2012

Notes

References

External links
 President's Trophy 2012–13 at the PCB official website
 President's Trophy 2012–13 at ESPN Cricinfo

2012-13 President's Trophy
2012 in Pakistani cricket
2013 in Pakistani cricket
Domestic cricket competitions in 2012–13